Il campanello or Il campanello di notte (The Night Bell) is a dramma giocoso, or opera, in one act by Gaetano Donizetti.  The composer wrote the Italian libretto after Mathieu-Barthélemy Troin Brunswick and Victor Lhérie's French vaudeville La sonnette de nuit.  The premiere took place on 1 June 1836 at the Teatro Nuovo in Naples and was "revived every year over the next decade".

Performance history
The opera was presented in Italian at the Lyceum Theatre in London on 6 June 1836 and in English on 9 March 1841. It was also given in English in 1870.  It was first performed in Italian in the US in Philadelphia on 25 October 1861; this production went on to New York three days later. An English translation was seen in that city on 7 May 1917.

Among other performances, the work was staged by Teatro Regio di Torino in 1995 and by the Donizetti festival, Bergamo in 2010.

Roles

Synopsis 

Time: Early 19th century
Place: Naples
At the lavish home of Annibale Pistacchio, guests have gathered to celebrate the marriage of the famous doctor to his young bride, Serafina. Among the guests is Enrico, Serafina's scheming cousin and former romantic interest who is determined to win Serafina back. After failing in his direct plea to Serafina, Enrico placates the groom with a rousing toast before leaving.

Just as Annibale is preparing for his wedding night with Serafina, the doorbell rings, revealing Enrico disguised as a patient in need of medicine. He delays the doctor's first night in his marriage bed by telling long stories and messing with the apartment. While Annibale is distracted, Enrico leaves a threatening message in Serafina's door. He then leaves only to return soon after as a singer with a hoarse voice. As Annibale's frustration grows, Enrico continues to find absurd reasons to delay the doctor's sleep. He departs and returns once more, this time as a blind man demanding a complex medicine for his sick “wife.” Annibale tries to usher him out and return to Serafina, but it is too late. Dawn has arrived, and he must leave to oversee his aunt's will in Rome. Serafina ushers him out the door, and Enrico joins the guests in reminding Annibale that the pleasures of his wedding night will follow him for the rest of his life. Everyone bids Annibale goodbye.

Recordings

References
Notes

Cited sources
Osborne, Charles, (1994),  The Bel Canto Operas of Rossini, Donizetti, and Bellini,  Portland, Oregon: Amadeus Press. 
Weinstock, Herbert (1963), Donizetti and the World of Opera in Italy, Paris, and Vienna in the First Half of the Nineteenth Century, New York: Pantheon Books, 1963. 

Other sources
Allitt, John Stewart (1991), Donizetti: in the light of Romanticism and the teaching of Johann Simon Mayr, Shaftesbury: Element Books, Ltd (UK); Rockport, MA: Element, Inc.(USA)
Ashbrook, William (1982), Donizetti and His Operas, Cambridge University Press.  
Ashbrook, William  (1998), "Donizetti, Gaetano" in Stanley Sadie  (Ed.),  The New Grove Dictionary of Opera, Vol. One. London: Macmillan Publishers, Inc.   
Ashbrook, William and Sarah Hibberd (2001), in  Holden, Amanda (Ed.), The New Penguin Opera Guide, New York: Penguin Putnam. .  pp. 224 – 247.
Black, John (1982), Donizetti’s Operas in Naples, 1822—1848. London: The Donizetti Society.
Loewenberg, Alfred (1970). Annals of Opera, 1597-1940, 2nd edition.  Rowman and Littlefield
Sadie, Stanley, (Ed.); John Tyrell (Exec. Ed.) (2004), The New Grove Dictionary of Music and Musicians.  2nd edition. London: Macmillan.    (hardcover).   (eBook).

External links
  Donizetti Society (London) website
 Libretto (Italian)

Italian-language operas
Operas by Gaetano Donizetti
Operas
1836 operas
One-act operas
Operas based on plays
Operas set in Naples